Amelia B. Coppuck Welby (Coppuck; pen name, Amelia; nickname, "Minstrel-girl"; February 3, 1819 - May 3, 1852) was a 19th-century American fugitive poet. In 1837, under the pen-name "Amelia," she contributed a number of poems to the Louisville "Journal," acquiring a reputation as a notable poet. She published in 1844 a small volume of poems, which quickly passed through several editions. It was republished in 1850, in New York City, in enlarged form, with illustrations by Robert Walter Weir. Though many of her poems were on the subject of death, including "The Bereaved", "The Dying Girl", "The Dying Mother",  "The First Death of the Household", "The Mournful Heart", and "Sudden Death", she was one of the most popular poets in the South before the Civil War. Amelia Welby died in 1852.

Early life and education
Amelia Ball Coppuck was born in Saint Michaels, Maryland, February 3, 1819. When she was still quite young, her parents moved to Baltimore. She lived her girlhood in or near this city up to age 15. In 1834 or 1835, the family moved to Kentucky and took up residence, first in Lexington and later in Louisville. In this latter city, Welby's's brief, quiet life was spent. 

She received a careful education.

Career
The Minstrel-girl -a nickname she gave herself- began at the age of eighteen to write poetry for the Louisville Journal, then edited by the poet, George D. Prentice, over the signature of "Amelia," and kept up her contributions regularly for ten years. Her productions were admired, and she soon became famous. Copied from paper to paper, her fugitive poems caught the fancy of the people of what was then known as the "American West," and before long, the great reviewers of the East thought her talent worthy of their respect. Prentice, as well as Rufus Wilmot Griswold, and Edgar Allan Poe were among the critics who praised Welby's light melody and varied fancy, while also pointing out her lack of discipline and lack of originality. Poe was one of her warmest friends.

When a volume of her poems appeared in 1844, it quickly passed through several editions, and many of her songs were set to music. In 1845, a small octavo volume of her poems, published in Boston, proved so popular that D. Appleton & Company sought and obtained the right of publication, bringing out fifteen editions within the next fifteen years.

There is one poem by Welby —perhaps her very best— that lived in the memory of thousands of a certain generation, though the name of the author was forgotten. It was the good fortune of "The Rainbow" to inherit a place, with a mere mention of the author, in George Frederick Holmes' Fifth Reader, one of that series of school books so prominent in the South during the last quarter of the 19th century. Boys and girls all admired and loved  "The Rainbow," and even later, as men and women, fondly repeated the lines, thinking of the poem, not as the production of Welby, but simply as a bright page in the old reader.

Personal life
In 1838, at the age of nineteen, she married George B. Welby, a merchant of Louisville. She died in Louisville, May 3, 1852, the mother of one child, a son, born two months before her death.

Style and themes
Though she appeared happy with her life in Kentucky, her poetic mood was chiefly that of reminiscence. She began writing poetry at the age of 18, but not of the passionate present or the golden future but rather that of a regretted past. Half of her poems were in this vein. Many times, contrary to the spirit of her theme, she yielded to melancholy. Though "Summer Birds" furnishes matter for the morning or noontide, after a few cheery verses, she introduces "beneath the moon's pale ray" and "among the tombs". Here, as in so many of her poems, sea, sky, and loved ones come out of the past. Mnemosyne, the goddess of memory, was her favorite muse.

Her prevailing mood being reminiscent, it was attended by sadness and melancholy. She loved the twilight and moonlight, and often spoke of death. Many of her brightest effusions ended with a sigh; and with all this, very consistently, there was a mingling of religious hope and faith. Her poetry lacking wit or humor, it would, at most, find sentiment or fancies uttered in melodious rhythm.

Light, varied fancy, tender sentiment, a persistent note of pathos, a prompt and facile rhythm -— these were the qualities that won for Welby at the beginning a generous welcome. From the 74 pieces included in the fullest edition of her poetry, a varied selection was made, and her ability was evident. A tone of quiet personal confidence, revealed the melancholy that mused upon a happy past. The critics acknowledged her gift, and discerned signs of promise.

Had that promise been fulfilled, her songs would have kept much of the popularity they first won. Instead, monotony and dullness took the place of memories and fancies. Her theme, but not her energy, became exhausted, and, conscious of this state, she became sad at heart. Her narrow range of experience with the tendency to self-repetition, the lack of literary discipline with the tendency to diffuseness, these made against her fame in the long run.

Welby might have attained high rank among the lyric poets if her skills from the first had been steadily disciplined. But she was unschooled and unguided, as she herself confessed: "'Tis with an untaught hand I sweep the chords." Left, therefore, to her own accord, she repeated herself not only from one poem to another, but not infrequently from stanza to stanza. She lacked skill with condensation, and nearly all her pieces showed twice too many words. The early critics warned her against repetition and diffuseness, but she chose not to take heed. The last four years of her life were lived in silence.

Notes

References

Attribution

Bibliography

External links
 
 
 "Life and Poems of Amelia Welby, by Ella Hutchinson Ellwanger" Register of the Kentucky State Historical Society, Volume 15

1819 births
1852 deaths
19th-century American poets
19th-century American women writers
19th-century pseudonymous writers
People from Talbot County, Maryland
American women poets
Pseudonymous women writers
Wikipedia articles incorporating text from A Woman of the Century